The 1987 Seattle Seahawks season was the team's 12th season with the National Football League (NFL). After two seasons of missing the postseason, the Seahawks returned to the playoffs.

The 1987 season would be Kenny Easley's last due to a kidney failure caused from an aspirin overdose, which forced him into retirement. The Seahawks selected Brian Bosworth from the University of Oklahoma, who signed the biggest rookie contract in NFL history.

1987 NFL Draft

Personnel

Staff

 Head athletic trainer - Jim Whitesel 
 Assistant athletic trainer - John Kasik

NFL replacement players
After the league decided to use replacement players during the NFLPA strike, the following team was assembled:

Final roster

     Starters in bold.
 (‡) Denotes strike replacement players.
 (*) Denotes players that were selected for the 1988 Pro Bowl.

Schedule

Preseason

Source: Seahawks Media Guides

Regular season
Divisional matchups this season have the AFC West playing the NFC Central.

A 24-day players' strike reduced the 16-game season to 15. The games that were scheduled for the third week of the season were canceled, but the games for weeks 4–6 were played with replacement players. 85% of the veteran players did not cross picket lines during the strike, putting in question the integrity of the 1987 season results.

The teams fielded by NFL clubs bore little resemblance to those the fans had come to recognize through previous seasons. Fans tagged the replacement player teams with mock names like "Seattle Sea-scabs."

Bold indicates division opponents.
Source: 1987 NFL season results

Postseason

Standings

Game Summaries

Preseason

Week P1: at Los Angeles Rams

Week P2: at St. Louis Cardinals

Week P3: vs. Detroit Lions

Week P4: vs. San Francisco 49ers

Regular season

Week 1: at Denver Broncos

Week 2: vs. Kansas City Chiefs

Week 4: vs. Miami Dolphins

Week 5: vs. Cincinnati Bengals

Week 6: at Detroit Lions

Week 7: at Los Angeles Raiders

Week 8: vs. Minnesota Vikings

Week 9: at New York Jets

Week 10: vs. Green Bay Packers

Week 11: vs. San Diego Chargers

Week 12: vs. Los Angeles Raiders

Week 13: at Pittsburgh Steelers

Week 14: vs. Denver Broncos

Week 15: at Chicago Bears

Week 16: at Kansas City Chiefs

Postseason

Seattle entered the postseason as the #5 seed in the AFC.

AFC Wild Card Playoff: at #4 Houston Oilers

References

External links
 Seahawks draft history at NFL.com
 1987 NFL season results at NFL.com

Seattle
Seattle Seahawks seasons